Anton Harrison (born February 2, 2002) is an American football offensive tackle. He played college football at Oklahoma, where he was named a consensus All-American in 2022.

Early career
Harrison attended Archbishop Carroll High School in Washington, D.C., where he played football and basketball. He was selected to play in the 2019 Under Armour All-American Game. Harrison played offensive tackle for the Oklahoma Sooners from 2020 to 2022.

References

External links
Oklahoma Sooners bio

Living people
Players of American football from Washington, D.C.
American football offensive tackles
Oklahoma Sooners football players
2002 births